In the Name of the Family is a Canadian documentary film, directed by Shelley Saywell and released in 2010. The film is an exploration of the issue of honor killing, focusing in part on the 2007 murder of Aqsa Parvez.

The film premiered on May 1, 2010 at the Hot Docs Canadian International Documentary Festival, where it won the award for Best Canadian Feature Documentary. It was subsequently a Genie Award nominee for Best Feature Length Documentary at the 31st Genie Awards in 2011.

References

External links
 

2010 films
2010 documentary films
Canadian documentary films
Documentary films about honor killing
2010s English-language films
2010s Canadian films